Belleau may refer to:

People
 Anthony Belleau (born 1996), French rugby footballer
 Bernard Belleau (1925–1989), Canadian chemist
 Isidore-Noël Belleau (1848–1936), Canadian politician
 Lesley Belleau, Canadian Anishinaabe writer
 Narcisse-Fortunat Belleau (1808–1894), first Lieutenant Governor of Quebec
 Rémy Belleau (1528–1577), French playwright

Places
 France
 Belleau, Aisne
 Belleau, Meurthe-et-Moselle
 Belleau Abbey, in Marne

 United Kingdom
 Belleau, Lincolnshire

See also 
 Belleau Wood (disambiguation)